The Tyrrell 008 was a Formula One car manufactured and raced by the Tyrrell Racing Organisation team during the 1978 season. Driven by Didier Pironi and Patrick Depailler, it achieved several podium finishes including a win at the 1978 Monaco Grand Prix.

Development
The Tyrrell 008 was designed by Maurice Philippe to replace the six-wheeler Tyrrell P34 used the previous two seasons. It used an aluminum monocoque in front of a V8 Cosworth DFV.

The 008 was originally conceived as a fan car, similar to the Brabham BT46. The idea was to position the radiators in the underside of the car, in turn tidying up the aerodynamics, and use the fan to extract heat from them. A small rear mounted fan had been developed to cool the oil and water radiators with the added bonus of aerodynamic downforce, but unlike Gordon Murray's effort, the team could not get the technology to work effectively. The car regularly overheated during testing and the fan was quietly dropped. Murray's assistant, David Cox, had however observed the 008 in testing and gave his boss all of the details that he could.

Racing history
For 1978, Tyrrell brought in Didier Pironi to drive alongside Patrick Depailler.  The 008 made its debut in the season opening Argentine Grand Prix, where Depailler qualified 10th and finished in third. Although he retired from the following Brazilian Grand Prix, he recorded consecutive podiums at the next three events; a second in South Africa, a third in the United States and his maiden win in Monaco, where he achieved his best qualifying of the year, fifth. He scored three more points finishes during the remainder of the season, the best of these second in the Austrian Grand Prix. Reliability was an issue for he only finished eight races.

Pironi was 23rd on the grid in Argentina and brought his car home in 14th place. He scored a point for sixth place at the next race in Brazil, the first of his five-point finishes for 1978. His best placing was 5th, achieved twice, in Monaco and Germany. His best qualifying was ninth, in Austria, one of only two races where he out-qualified Depailler.

The team finished in fourth place in the Constructor's Championship with a total of 38 points. Depailler was fifth in the Driver's Championship with 34 points while Pironi was 15th with seven points.

Complete Formula One World Championship results
(key) (Results in bold indicate pole position; results in italics indicate fastest lap.)

Notes

References

Tyrrell Formula One cars